Smoke Ghost (1998) is the third full-length studio album released on CD by Tadpoles and is the first album with Tadpoles' new drummer, Adam Boyette. Upon original release, Bakery Records included a copy of Tadpoles Destroy Terrastock - Live with all mail-orders. The song "Breaking" is a re-recording of the original version which appeared on the group's 1992 cassette-only album, Superwhip. "Know Your Ghosts" is identical to the version which was released on the 1997 Know Your Ghosts E.P.

Track listing

"When I Feel" (Kramer) – 5:28
"Snow Down" (Parker) – 5:57
"Breaking" (Parker) – 3:07
"Happy Feet" (Kramer) – 5:21
"Jaded Jean" (Parker/Max)) – 3:50
"Rainbowmaker (Kramer)" – 4:45
"Know Your Ghosts" (Kramer/Max) – 4:20
"Sense" (Parker)  – 4:08
"Firecracker" (Kramer) – 4:44
"Percolate" (Parker) – 9:31

Personnel

Todd Parker - Vocals on 2,3,5,8,10 and Guitars, Emulator
Nick Kramer - Vocals on 1,4,6,7,9 and Guitars
David Max - Bass
Adam Boyette - Drums and Percussion

Production
Smoke Ghost was produced, engineered and mixed by Mark Kramer (Shimmy Disc) at Noise New Jersey Studio in 1997. Additional engineering by Steve Watson. Album artwork and design was created by Ann Manca. Mastered by Todd Parker at dbs digital in Hoboken, NJ.

1998 albums
Tadpoles (band) albums